Mexican immigration to Spain refers to the Mexican population in Spain and their Spanish-born descendants. The Mexicans living in Spain are composed primarily of students, skilled professionals, spouses of Spaniards, as well as Mexican citizens who also have Spanish nationality. In December 2008, the National Statistics Institute in Spain had 14,399 registered Mexicans within its territory, of which 7,210 hold other nationalities of the European Union or are family members of EU citizens. To this number must be added those with dual nationality, who are not in Spanish records as foreigners. Mexican and Spanish laws allow dual citizenship, and many Mexicans who have asked for it, whether they are residents in Spain as grandchildren or they are children of Spanish migrants to Mexico. In 2010, the Ministry of Foreign Affairs of Mexico recorded 21,107 Mexicans living in Spain, who became the third largest Mexican community residing abroad, after the United States and Canada; and the largest Mexican community in Europe. However, they are the least numerous Latin community in Spain.

The main destinations of the Mexican community according to the INE, are the autonomous communities of Madrid with 4,138; Catalonia with 4,482 and Andalusia with 2,822. Of the Mexican migrants living in Spain, 61% are women, mainly from the Mexican states of Jalisco, Nuevo León, Veracruz, Baja California, Hidalgo, Puebla, Querétaro, Sinaloa, Yucatán, Chihuahua and Chiapas. The typical profile of the Mexican immigrant is a middle-aged individual from the upper-middle class, concentrated in Madrid, Barcelona, and Seville. There are many examples of graduate students who have built working relationships and emotional ties that lead to them remaining in Spain.

Spain has always been the European country where the majority of Mexican emigrants to Europe go to, but since 2012, Mexican citizens are migrating more to other European countries, such as Germany, Switzerland, France, the Netherlands and the United Kingdom, following the economic crisis that Spain has undergone in recent years.

History

After Spain completed the conquest of Mexico-Tenochtitlan, the first marriages between the daughters of the Emperor Moctezuma Ilhuilcamina and the Spanish soldiers of Extremadura were carried out.

The first Spanish-born Mexicans to arrive on their native soil were the children of soldiers in Hernán Cortés's army who returned to Seville and Extremadura and the descendants of Aztec royalty which included the titled Duke of Moctezuma de Tultengo and in Granada, the Counts of Miravalle.

At the end of the sixteenth century, after Mariana de Carvajal married Juan de Toledo Toledo-Moctezuma, who was a descendant of Juan Cano de Saavedra and Isabel Moctezuma, daughter of the Aztec emperor Moctezuma II, who built his palace in Cáceres with a coats of arms incorporating those of the families of Toledo Carvajal as well as Moctezuma.

During the early twentieth century, there was already a permanent Mexican community in Spain, many of whom were exiled during the Mexican Revolution. Some Porfirian families chose to be exiled rather than continue to live under the new government.

At the beginning of Spanish Civil War, many Mexicans were part of the armed movements in the territory of Spain, supporting the Republican fighters.

In the twentieth century, the causes of migration are different, mainly marital links with citizens of Spain, student exchanges or university graduate, which the labor supply and naturalization arises; and the existing economic dynamism between Mexico and Spain, thus achieving the establishment of numerous Mexican companies in the Iberian peninsula.

In 2015, a legislation conferring Sephardic Jews the right to get Spanish citizenship under the right of return principle was approved in Spain; within a year 88 Mexican Jews were granted Spanish nationality.

Mexican culture in Spain

As for concerning Spanish cuisine, the influence of Hispanic flavors in the kitchen is very marked in the rest of Hispanic America and the Philippines. The Spanish kitchen also was enriched with Mexican products such as tomatoes, corn, avocado, vanilla and fine chocolate, which was Mesoamerican origin.

Ranchera and mariachi music are well appreciated and disseminated within the Spanish society. There are important interpreters of music that express the different rhythms and lyrics of Mexican singer-songwriters or composers. Rocío Dúrcal is an icon that has been well identified with the ranchera genres.

Mexican architecture in Spain is mainly expressed by the modern movement and the colors of the walls used by Luis Barragán and Ricardo Legorreta, Mexican architects have built several buildings with a clear stylistic formality. Sheraton Bilbao and Housing Parque Europa in Madrid hotel are constructions with shapes and styles of contemporary Mexican architecture.

Mexican communities
Spain is the third country where Mexicans immigrate to. It is noteworthy that there is no relationship with the Mexican immigration to the United States or to Canada. Mexicans who immigrate to Spain or the rest of the European continent are primarily middle or high class, they don't engage in the harvesting of fruits or vegetables or other hourly labor as with African, South American or Asians immigrants; rather they are recruited from Mexico to operate in any Mexican or Spanish company, of which many of them occupy important positions. 

Many Mexicans abroad are by business or labor issues that were brought by major Mexican business groups who settled in this country such as Grupo Bimbo, Cemex, Aceros de Monterrey, Jumex, pharmacy, among others. Mexican companies have found an important development among Spanish consumers by the similar way that the Mexican entrepreneurs do business in connection with Americans.

Social status
Mexican migration to Spain differs from that to the United States in many ways.
 Mexican immigrants represent a small proportion of immigrants in Spain (less than half of one percent.)
 They have a relatively long history of migration to the Kingdom of Spain, with most arriving since the 1620s.

While approximately 1,000 Mexicans enter Spain each year as temporary students or construction contract workers, they are not counted as immigrants because of their explicitly temporary legal status.

Other factors
The illegal drug trade is the reason the Spanish prison system has a presence of approximately 10,000 Hispanic American citizens, of whom 393 are Mexican men and women between 25 and 50 years of age serving sentences of up to nine years in prison, while in 1990 there were 6 and 37 in 2000 Mexican prisoners. After the United States, the Foreign Ministry has in its Mexican embassy in Madrid the second busiest processes related to drug trafficking.

Mexican diplomatic consular offices in Spain
 Embassy of Mexico in Madrid
Consulate in Barcelona, Catalonia
Honorary consulate in Gijón, Asturias
Honorary consulate in Murcia, Region of Murcia
Honorary consulate in Palma de Mallorca, Balearic Islands
Honorary consulate in Santa Cruz de Tenerife, Canary Islands
Honorary consulate in Seville, Andalusia
Honorary consulate in Valencia, Valencian Community
Honorary consulate in Zaragoza, Aragon

Statistics

Notable Mexican residents in Spain

Juan Ruiz de Alarcón, Novohispanic poet.
Alaska, singer.
Mark Consuelos, actor.
Eduardo Noriega, actor

See also

Spanish immigration to Mexico
Mexico–Spain relations
Immigration to Spain

References

External links
 Mexicans in Spain
 Mexicanos.com.es

 
Ethnic groups in Spain
Mexico–Spain relations
Spain